Chris Harju (born 20 May 1957) is a former American rugby union player.

Biography 
Harju was a member of the  squad that won the inaugural 1991 Women's Rugby World Cup in Wales. She made her last appearance for the United States in the Final against , where she kicked in seven points to help her side win the first World Cup.

Harju had toured Britain with the Wiverns, an unofficial USA team, in 1985. She was a critical care nurse outside of rugby. In 2017, Harju and the 1991 World Cup squad were inducted into the United States Rugby Hall of Fame.

References 

Living people
1957 births
Female rugby union players
American female rugby union players
United States women's international rugby union players